Railroaded is a 1923 American silent drama film directed by Edmund Mortimer and starring Herbert Rawlinson, Esther Ralston and David Torrence.

Synopsis
In England Richard Ragland, the son of a prominent judge, is sent to prison on false evidence. After escaping he changes his name and vows vengeance on the man who put him there.

Cast
 Herbert Rawlinson as	Richard Ragland
 Esther Ralston as Joan Dunster
 Alfred Fisher as 	Hugh Dunster
 David Torrence as 	Judge Garbin
 Lionel Belmore as 	Foster
 Mike Donlin as Corton
 Herbert Fortier as Bishop Selby

References

Bibliography
 Connelly, Robert B. The Silents: Silent Feature Films, 1910-36, Volume 40, Issue 2. December Press, 1998.
 Munden, Kenneth White. The American Film Institute Catalog of Motion Pictures Produced in the United States, Part 1. University of California Press, 1997.

External links
 

1923 films
1923 drama films
1920s English-language films
American silent feature films
Silent American drama films
Films directed by Edmund Mortimer
American black-and-white films
Universal Pictures films
Films set in England
1920s American films